The 1993 State of Origin Championships, known formally as the CUB AFL State of Origin championship, was the last Australian rules football series held involving representative teams of all Australian states. It was the first and last such tournament run by the AFL Commission. It was the first tournament to combine Territory with state teams.

While Victoria and Tasmania and South Australia and Western Australia would play as their own States, New South Wales combined with Australian Capital Territory and Queensland were combined with Northern Territory. The two composite teams gave Queensland and New South Wales the first opportunity to select their teams under State of Origin criteria since the 1988 Bicentennial Carnival, but also meant the end of standalone participation by the two Territories. Aided significantly by the small Northern Territory contingent, it was the first successful tournament featuring a side under the banner of Queensland, which defeated Tasmania to win Section Two.

South Australia defeated Victoria in the section 1 final by 12 points in front of a crowd of 31,792 at the Melbourne Cricket Ground.
Queensland–Northern Territory defeated Tasmania in the section 2 final by 34 points in front of a crowd of 9,660, at Bellerive Oval.

Format and Rules
All 4 matches were played under the same rules as that of the 1993 pre season premiership, the Foster's Cup, with all 4 quarters running for 20 minutes, and time-on added on for scores and for the treating of injured players, and extra time if the scores were level at full time.

1993 AFL State of Origin matches

|- style="background:#ccf;"
! width=02%| Home team
! width=02%| Score
! width=02%| Away team
! width=02%| Score
! width=02%| Ground
! width=02%| City/Town
! width=02%| Crowd
! width=02%| Date
! width=02%| Time
! width=02%| Broadcast Network
|- style="background:#fff;"
| Victoria
| 19.16 (130)
| NSW-A.C.T.
| 8.17 (65)
| MCG
| Melbourne
| 22,409
| 1 June 1993 
| 7:00 PM
| 7 Network 
|- style="background:#ccf;"
! width=02%| Home team
! width=02%| Score
! width=02%| Away team
! width=02%| Score
! width=02%| Ground
! width=02%| City/Town
! width=02%| Crowd
! width=02%| Date
! width=02%| Time
! width=02%| Broadcast Network
|- style="background:#fff;"
| S. Australia
| 19.13 (127)
| W. Australia
| 14.7 (91)
| Football Park
| Adelaide
| 21,487
| 2 June 1993 
| 8:00 PM
| 7 Network
|- style="background:#ccf;"
! width=02%| Home team
! width=02%| Score
! width=02%| Away team
! width=02%| Score
! width=02%| Ground
! width=02%| City/Town
! width=02%| Crowd
! width=02%| Date
! width=02%| Time
! width=02%| Broadcast Network
|- style="background:#fff;"
| Victoria
| 14.13 (97)
| S. Australia
| 16.13 (109)
| MCG
| Melbourne
| 31,792
| 5 June 1993 
| 4:40 PM
| 7 Network
|- style="background:#ccf;"
! width=02%| Home team
! width=02%| Score
! width=02%| Away team
! width=02%| Score
! width=02%| Ground
! width=02%| City/Town
! width=02%| Crowd
! width=02%| Date
! width=02%| Time
! width=02%| Broadcast Network
|- style="background:#fff;"
| Tasmania
| 10.16 (76)
| Queensland-N. T.
| 16.14 (110)
| Bellerive Oval
| Hobart
| 9,660
| 6 June 1993 
| 12:00 PM
| 7 Network

1993 AFL State of Origin Section Winners
 Section 1 – South Australia
 Section 2 – Queensland–Northern Territory

1993 AFL State of Origin Medal Winners
 Section 1 – Semi Final 1: * E. J. Whitten Medal: Chris Langford (Victoria)
 Section 1 – Semi Final 2: * Fos Williams Medal: Greg Anderson (South Australia)
 Section 1 – Grand Final: * Fos Williams Medal: Craig Bradley (South Australia) 
 Section 1 – Grand Final: * E. J. Whitten Medal: Robert Harvey (Victoria)
 Section 2 – Grand Final:

1993 AFL State of Origin Squads

References

Australian rules interstate football
1993 in Australian rules football